Laraquete River is a small river in Arauco Province, Bío Bío Region of Chile. Its sources are in the Nahuelbuta Range and they flow west to its mouth at the bay of Arauco and the foot of the hill of Andalicán where there is located the town of Laraquete.

Sources 
 Francisco Solano Asta Buruaga y Cienfuegos, Diccionario geográfico de la República de Chile, NUEVA YORK, D. APPLETON Y COMPAÑÍA, 1899: Laraquete (Rio de). Page 358

External links 
   Google Map: Rio Laraquete

Rivers of Chile
Rivers of Biobío Region